Uentrop may refer to:

Uentrop (Lenne), a river of North Rhine-Westphalia, Germany, tributary of the Lenne
Uentrop, a district of the town Hamm, North Rhine-Westphalia, Germany
Uentrop, a district of the town Arnsberg, North Rhine-Westphalia, Germany